The Massachusetts Minutewomen basketball team, also known as the UMass Minutewomen, represents the University of Massachusetts Amherst in Amherst, Massachusetts, in NCAA Division I women's college basketball. They play their home games in the William D. Mullins Memorial Center. The Minutewomen currently compete in the Atlantic 10 Conference.

History
UMass has played women's basketball since 1968. They have made the NCAA Tournament three times, in 1996, 1998 and 2022. In the former, they lost 60-57 to Michigan State in the First Round. In 1998, they lost 77-59 to Iowa in the First Round. They have one appearance in the WNIT (1995), beating VCU 70-61 but losing 80-59 to Texas A&M and 90-72 to Notre Dame. They won their first conference tournament in 2022, having previously captured the East Division in 1998. As of the end of the 2015-16 season, the Minutewomen have an all-time record of 535-707.

Postseason

References

External links